East Wall Road runs from the junction of the East-Link drawbridge and North Wall Quay, along the side of the northern part of Dublin port to the junction of the North Strand Road and Poplar Row.

History 
East Wall Road takes its name from its eastern position within Dublin city, and appear on maps in 1851 and 1876.

Buildings and areas 
The Point Theatre lay at its southern end before it was demolished to make way for the O2 in 2008. It marks the boundary between the port and the residential area of East Wall. Much of the western side of the road north of East Road is residential, in contrast to the other side.

The Docklands Innovation Park is located on East Wall Road, in which a number of businesses including 103.2 Dublin City FM is located.

See also

List of streets and squares in Dublin

References 

Streets in Dublin (city)
Dublin Docklands